Graphium may refer to:

 Graphium (butterfly), a genus of  mostly tropical swallowtail butterflies
 Graphium (fungus), a genus of fungi in the family Microascaceae